Vujadin Boškov (16 May 1931 – 27 April 2014) was a Serbian footballer and manager.

A midfielder, he played 57 matches for the Yugoslav national team. He experienced his greatest success as a coach in 1990, when he won the European Cup Winners' Cup with Sampdoria. He also reached the European Cup final in 1981 with Real Madrid and 1992 with Sampdoria. He also won the Yugoslav First League as technical director and the La Liga, the Copa del Rey twice, the Serie A and the Coppa Italia twice as a coach.

Throughout his career as a football manager, he stood out both for his many successes, as well as due to his unique sense of humour and memorable ironic comments, which were used to dissolve tension during post-match interviews; these led him to become a popular figure with football fans during his time in Italy.

FC Vujadin Boškov, Vojvodina's training facility in Veternik, was named after him in 1996 and in February 2022, he was posthumously admitted to the Italian Football Hall of Fame.

Early life and club career
Boškov was born in the Serbian village of Begeč,  from Novi Sad in Bunarska Street to father Boja, a village carpenter, and mother Marija. His family lived in Novi Sad before moving to Begeč during the Second World War where his grandfather lived. Vujadin had an older brother named Aca (also a footballer), who was six years older than Vujadin, who died very young. Vujadin also has two younger sisters, sister Verica (Vera) and sister Danica (Dada), the latter still living. Boškov graduated from the Trgovačka akademija (trade school).

A fan of his local team, Boškov played with FK Vojvodina for most of his career (1946–1960), as well as continuously supporting it. In 1961 he moved to Italy to play for Serie A club Sampdoria for one season (1961–62), before accepting a stint as a player-coach at Swiss side Young Fellows Zürich (1962–1964). Boškov then returned to the club that made him as a player – FK Vojvodina – and spent seven seasons (1964–1971) as a technical director, leading the club to winning one Yugoslav league championship in 1965–66.

International career
He also became a playing member of the Yugoslavia national team, and was part of the team that won the silver medal at the 1952 Olympic football tournament. Also he played at the 1954 and 1958 FIFA World Cups.

Managerial career
Boškov soon developed a successful international coaching career with stints in the Dutch Eredivisie with ADO Den Haag (1974–1976), and Feyenoord (1976–1978), the Spanish La Liga with Real Zaragoza (1978–79), Real Madrid (1979–1982), and Sporting de Gijon (1983–84), the Italian Serie A with Ascoli (1984–1986), U.C. Sampdoria (1986–1992, 1997–98), A.S. Roma (1992–93), S.S.C. Napoli (1994–1996), and A.C. Perugia (1999), and the Swiss league with Servette FC (1996–97).

Arguably his greatest achievement as a coach came in 1991, when he steered Sampdoria to the Serie A scudetto.
The following season, he led the club to the European Cup final, where they lost 1–0 to Barcelona at Wembley. His Sampdoria side often used a man-marking defensive system.

He also coached Yugoslavia at Euro 2000, where they famously lost 4–3 to Spain in Brugge and later went out to hosts the Netherlands in the quarter-finals, after losing 6–1 to the Dutch.

He finished out his career as a scout for Sampdoria in 2006.

Boškov, known for his humorous and ironic quips in interviews, famously once said, "a penalty is when the referee whistles."

Death and legacy
Boškov died after a long illness in Novi Sad, on 27 April 2014, aged 82. He was interred on 30 April in the Begeč Cemetery.

Footballer Vujadin Savić is named after Boškov. In 1996, the FK Vojvodina training facility in Veternik was named after Boškov. Corriere dello sport published a book of his quotations e.g. "Quando l'arbitro fischia... it is a penalty".

In February 2022, he was posthumously admitted to the Italian Football Hall of Fame, by decision of leading figures in the Italian media.

Managerial statistics

Honours

Manager
Vojvodina
 Yugoslav First League: 1965–66 (as technical director)

ADO Den Haag
 KNVB Cup: 1974–75

Real Madrid
 La Liga: 1979–80
 Copa del Rey: 1979–80

Ascoli
 Serie B: 1985–86

Sampdoria
 European Cup Winners' Cup: 1989–90
 Serie A: 1990–91
 Coppa Italia: 1987–88, 1988–89
 Supercoppa Italiana: 1991

Individual
 Italian Football Hall of Fame: 2021

References

External links
 
 

1931 births
2014 deaths
Footballers from Novi Sad
Association football wingers
Yugoslav footballers
Yugoslav expatriate sportspeople in Spain
Yugoslav expatriate sportspeople in Switzerland
Yugoslav expatriate footballers
Yugoslavia international footballers
Serbian footballers
Olympic silver medalists for Yugoslavia
Olympic footballers of Yugoslavia
Footballers at the 1952 Summer Olympics
Medalists at the 1952 Summer Olympics
Olympic medalists in football
1954 FIFA World Cup players
1958 FIFA World Cup players
FK Vojvodina players
U.C. Sampdoria players
SC Young Fellows Juventus players
Yugoslav expatriate sportspeople in Italy
Expatriate footballers in Italy
Expatriate footballers in Switzerland
Yugoslav First League players
Serie A players
Serbian football managers
Yugoslav football managers
Yugoslavia national football team managers
Serbia and Montenegro football managers
Serbia and Montenegro national football team managers
SC Young Fellows Juventus managers
ADO Den Haag managers
Feyenoord managers
Eredivisie managers
La Liga managers
Real Zaragoza managers
Real Madrid CF managers
Sporting de Gijón managers
Ascoli Calcio 1898 F.C. managers
U.C. Sampdoria managers
A.S. Roma managers
S.S.C. Napoli managers
A.C. Perugia Calcio managers
Serie A managers
Serie B managers
Expatriate football managers in Italy
Expatriate football managers in the Netherlands
Expatriate football managers in Spain
Expatriate football managers in Switzerland
Servette FC managers
UEFA Euro 2000 managers
Yugoslav expatriate sportspeople in the Netherlands